Shahrak-e Fath ol Mobin (also Romanized as Shahrak-e Fatḩ ol Mobīn) is a village in Balesh Rural District, in the Central District of Darab County, Fars Province, Iran. At the 2006 census, its population was 1,487, in 332 families.

References 

Populated places in Darab County